Time for Outrage! is the English translation of the bestselling tract Indignez-vous ! by the French diplomat, member of the French Resistance and concentration camp survivor Stéphane Hessel. Published in France in 2010, it has sold nearly 1.5 million copies in France and has been translated into numerous other languages.

Content 
The 94-year-old author starts with a brief reference to his participation in the French Resistance at the end of the Second World War, pointing out that outrage was at its roots. He then outlines two somewhat contradictory views of history that have both influenced him, that of the French philosopher Jean-Paul Sartre, who was his teacher at the Ecole normale superieure in Paris and that of the German writer Walter Benjamin, who was a colleague and a close friend of his father, Franz Hessel. The author asserts that indifference is the worst of attitudes. He speaks of his experience among the drafters of the Universal Declaration of Human Rights and exhorts young people to look around for topics of indignation. He then presents his own principal indignation at present, the strife in Palestine, the Gaza strip and the West Bank. He ends the tract by calling for non-violent action and for a peaceful uprising against the powers of finance capitalism.

“Ninety-three years old. The last leg of my journey. The end is in sight. I am lucky to be able to seize the time I have left to reflect on my lifelong commitment to politics: the Resistance and the program designed sixty-six years ago by the National Council of the Resistance.”

These are the opening lines from “A Time for Outrage!” (“Indignez-vous !”), a 35-page book written by Stephane Hessel in 2010 which sold 3 million copies in 30 languages and inspired protests like “Occupy” in the United States and The Indignados in Spain.

Reception 
In France, published by a small publisher in Montpellier, the 32-page booklet sold almost a million copies within the first ten weeks. It was a Christmas best-seller. It has been criticized for being poorly written and too short, but even critics have acknowledged the booklet has tapped into popular anger. In the beginning of January 2011, “Indignez-vous!” was at the headlines of German newspapers, even if the book was not translated at this calendar date into German and only available in French.

It has been translated into English, German, Spanish, Galician, Italian, Basque, Finnish, Catalan, Dutch, Portuguese, Turkish, Romanian, Slovenian, Serbian, Greek, Hebrew, and Korean. More translations are planned in Japanese, Swedish, Chinese and other languages.

Influence 
In 2011, one of the names given to the 2011 Spanish protests against corruption and bipartisan politics was Los Indignados (The Outraged), taken from the title of the book's translation there (¡Indignaos!). The Spanish protests later inspired other protests all around the world, including Greece, Israel and Occupy Wall Street in the United States.

See also 
 2011 Spanish protests
 Reacts
 Democracia real Ya
 Financial crisis of 2007–2008

References

External links 
 Author of Time for Outrage! Stéphane Hessel interviewed by Juan González on Democracy Now! October 10, 2011
 Time for Outrage! Charles Glass Books, official website (2011). Retrieved March 17, 2011
 Indigène éditions Official website, French edition. Retrieved March 17, 2011 
 ¡Indignaos! Spanish translation of Indignez-vous!  Retrieved June 12, 2015 
 Get Involved ! Official website for Stephane Hessel's new book "Get involved !" (Engagez-vous !) 
  Passive, Silent and Revolutionary: The ‘Arab Spring’ Revisited This article makes some connections between the Indignados of Spain and Greece and the Occupy movements in the US and UK to the simultaneous "Arab Spring" revolts.

Pamphlets
2010 essays